Shebu Town is an urban town in Xiangtan County, Hunan Province, People's Republic of China.  it had a population of 63,169 and an area of .

Administrative division

The town is divided into 50 villages and 2 communities, the following areas: 
 
 Tanhua Community
 Shaojing Community
 Shebu Village
 Wantang Village
 Xintang Village
 Batang Village
 Zhanggong Village
 Dayantang Village
 Shangchun Village
 Zhongxing Village
 Yuhua Village
 Jinling Village
 Hexia Village
 Gaofeng Village
 Yuanhu Village
 Xiaoli Village
 Hehua Village
 Baishui Village
 Wangchong Village
 Yujia Village
 Tiejiang Village
 Bishui Village
 Xinliao Village
 Shanshan Village
 Quntai Village
 Xianfeng Village
 Qiaoliang Village
 Quanjiang Village
 Quanxing Village
 Baoqian Village
 Shanxian Village
 Tuanshan Village
 Gutang Village
 Quanjing Village
 Yuetangchong Village
 Heli Village
 Honghu Village
 Luming Village
 Xinqiao Village
 Chaitang Village
 Xiashan Village
 Laiyi Village
 Guihua Village
 Gaoquan Village
 Fangshangqiao Village
 Dalitang Village
 Xiatang Village
 Fanglun Village
 Changyan Village
 Chizi Village
 Juyu Village
 Jianlong Village

History
In 1988, Shebu Township was built. In May 1995, Shebu Town was built.

Economy
The region abounds with iron, limestone and gold. Tea is important to the economy.

Education
There are 22 primary schools, five Middle schools and one high school located with the town,

Culture
Huaguxi is the most influence local theater.

Celebrity
James Soong (Song Chuyu), Taiwanese politician.

References

External links

Divisions of Xiangtan County